The Junior University College of Ceylon was a university college in Sri Lanka which operated from 1969 until 1972. It had several constituent campuses around Sri Lanka. In 1972, several of the campuses were separated into independent Advanced Technological Institutes .

History

Foundation and vision

The government of Ceylon established the six Junior University Colleges in 1969.

Part xvi of the Higher Education Act No. 20 of 1966 provided for the establishment of Junior University Colleges in Ceylon. They are two-year colleges, providing courses designed to meet the skill requirements of the developing nation. The primary aim is the further democratization of education by extending it beyond the secondary level.

Junior University Colleges make higher education an opportunity for many high potential students who may not reach the university system. The Junior University Colleges emphasize employment-oriented education rather than purely academic education.

The Junior University College concept was proposed by the Minister of Education and Cultural Affairs of Ceylon, I. M. R. A. Iriyagolla. In 1965, he visited the United States to study institutions of higher education. Among the institutions he visited were the junior colleges of Southern California. Impressed with what he saw, he "returned to Ceylon with renewed enthusiasm and determination to provide semi-professional education for his nation." Many educators and politicians supported the philosophy behind the movement.

Workshops
Immediately after the appointment of the first group of faculty in the spring of 1968, a series of workshops planned and directed by Charles C. Collins, the first of four scheduled Fulbright professors (1967–68), produced detailed course outlines and developed plans for a comprehensive student personnel services program. For the first time in the nation's history, the junior university colleges were to be manned by full-time guidance and placement counselors.

Junior University Colleges

References

Colleges in Sri Lanka